Behabad (also Romanized as Behābād and Bahābād; also known as Būhābād and Mahābād) is a city in the Central District of Behabad County, Yazd province, Iran, and serves as capital of the county. At the 2006 census, its population was 7,199 in 1,609 households, when it was in Behabad District of Bafq County. The following census in 2011 counted 7,652 people in 2,109 households, by which time the district had been elevated to the status of a county. The latest census in 2016 showed a population of 9,232 people in 2,778 households.

References 

Behabad County

Cities in Yazd Province

Populated places in Yazd Province

Populated places in Behabad County